The 1927 murder in Turkey of a Jewish woman named Elza Niego by a Turkish official sparked an anti-government demonstration at her funeral that authorities regarded as criminal. The Turkish government alleged that the slogans used in the manifestations were against Turkishness. Following the demonstration, ten Jewish protestors were detained, who were released after thirty days.

Murder

Elza Niego (22) was a typist of the National Insurance Company of Turkey. During a holiday at Heybeli island, a Muslim Turkish official Osman Bey fell in love with her. Osman Bey, who was 30 years older than Elza, would follow Elza around the island. In despair, Elza Niego cut short her vacation and went home. Elza Niego eventually became engaged to a Jewish co-worker. Osman Bey, who was enraged by the engagement, pursued Elza Niego and stabbed her to death with a knife.

Aftermath
During the funeral, a demonstration was held in opposition to the Turkish government. This created an anti-Semitic reaction in the Turkish press. Nine protestors were immediately arrested under the charge of offending "Turkishness", but acquitted from the charges in a first trial. Later, in second trial against nine Jews and also a Russian individual witness to murder was initiated. The defendants were arrested. Four of them were sentenced for the specific offense of "insulting Turkishness".

References

Turkish Jews
Jewish Turkish history
Antisemitism in Turkey
1927 in Turkey
Islam and antisemitism
1927 riots
1927 murders in Turkey
Violence against women in Turkey
Female murder victims
Murdered Jews